Alan Patrick Monegat (born 27 March 1983) is a Brazilian former football player.

Career
Alan Monegat played in the 2005 Chilean Primera División with Deportes Melipilla, but couldn't prevent the club's relegation. He also made two appearances in the 2010 Campeonato Pernambucano for Central Sport Club.

References

External links
Profile at Soccerway
Profile at BDFA 

1983 births
Living people
Sportspeople from Minas Gerais
Brazilian footballers
Brazilian expatriate footballers
Figueirense FC players
Alemannia Aachen players
Associação Académica de Coimbra – O.A.F. players
Deportes Melipilla footballers
C.D. Arturo Fernández Vial footballers
São Gabriel Futebol Clube players
Grêmio Esportivo Juventus players
Central Sport Club players
Primera B de Chile players
Chilean Primera División players
Expatriate footballers in Germany
Expatriate footballers in Portugal
Expatriate footballers in Chile
Expatriate footballers in Austria
Brazilian expatriate sportspeople in Germany
Brazilian expatriate sportspeople in Portugal
Brazilian expatriate sportspeople in Chile
Brazilian expatriate sportspeople in Austria
German footballers needing infoboxes
Association football midfielders